Linguistic nationalism may refer to:

 a dominant culture's use of language to exercise its dominance, see Linguistic imperialism.
 the use of linguistics to support nationalistic ideologies, see Historiography and nationalism.